Chirman-e Sofla (also Romanized as Chīrmān-e Soflá; also known as Chermān and Chīrmān) is a village in Tudeshk Rural District, Kuhpayeh District, Isfahan County, Isfahan Province, Iran. At the 2006 census, its population was 30, in 5 families.

References 

Populated places in Isfahan County